John Ross Taylor (1913 – November 6, 1994) was a Canadian fascist political activist and party leader prominent in white nationalist circles.

Early life and family
Born into a well-known Toronto, Ontario family, the son of lawyer Oscar Taylor and grandson of John Taylor, a Toronto manufacturer and alderman.

Fascism
Taylor's fascist activities began in the 1920s. In the 1930s he joined with the Quebec-based fascist leader Adrien Arcand in creating a national fascist party, the National Unity Party. Taylor played a key role in organizing the putative party in English Canada before he broke with Arcand and joined the Canadian Union of Fascists becoming its secretary and organizer.

Taylor was interned as a Nazi sympathizer for 53 months during World War II.

Post-war
During the 1960s, Taylor acted as the Canadian representative of the antisemitic National States' Rights Party and was based at his farm at Gooderham, north of Peterborough, Ontario, where he held fascist meetings and published virulent antisemitic and racist literature that led Canada Post to revoke his mailing privileges. He also led his own movement with David Stanley which he called "Natural Order".  In 1965, he was featured on the Canadian Broadcasting Corporation's public affairs program This Hour Has Seven Days. During his interview with CBC journalist Larry Zolf, Taylor called for Jews to be exiled to Madagascar.

Social Credit
In the 1963 Ontario election, he ran in St. Andrew riding for the "Social Credit Action", a splinter group from the Social Credit Party of Ontario. However, when his political past was reported, the Social Credit Action group dumped Taylor and he ran instead as a candidate of the "Natural Order of Social Credit Organization". He won 102 votes, or about 1% of the total cast.

Western Guard
Taylor was a founding member of the white supremacist political party, the Western Guard. He ran for Toronto City Council in the 1972 municipal election as a candidate for the Western Guard placing last in Ward 11. In 1973, he was the party's candidate in a provincial by-election in the Toronto riding of St. George where he came in sixth and last place with 83 votes (0.4% of the popular vote).

In the 1974 federal election, he was the Western Guard's candidate for the House of Commons of Canada in the riding of Davenport and described himself during an all candidates meeting as "a racist and a fascist". As the Western Guard was not a registered federal political party, he was officially an Independent candidate. Taylor received 102 votes (0.69% of the popular vote), placing fourth in a field of six candidates.

From 1970 to 1977, Taylor was again involved with the Social Credit Association of Ontario as a result of a takeover of the party by Paul Fromm and the Western Guard. In 1972, the Social Credit Party of Canada declared membership in the Western Guard "incompatible" with membership in Social Credit had the provincial association put into trusteeship and Taylor, Fromm and their supporters were expelled though Taylor continued to lead a splinter group that claimed to be the Social Credit party until 1977.

Canadian Human Rights Commission and imprisonment
In 1976, as a result of Don Andrews' conviction for hate crimes, he became leader of the Western Guard, renaming it the Western Guard Party. He also established ties to the Ku Klux Klan and attended the International Patriotic Conference held by David Duke that year.  In the 1980s, Taylor was twice found in contempt of court for refusing to comply with a 1979 order by the Canadian Human Rights Tribunal to end his recorded "White Power" messages on the Western Guard Party's phone line. He was imprisoned from October 1981 to March 1982, and again later in the decade for violating the Canadian Human Rights Act. In 1990, the Supreme Court of Canada upheld the ruling against Taylor, in the landmark case R v Taylor.

Later life
Taylor was a fixture during the 1989 trial of accused Nazi war criminal Imre Finta and could be seen carrying lawyer Douglas Christie's books. He was also an associate of Ernst Zündel and Jim Keegstra.

In the last years of his life, Taylor was active in the Aryan Nations after he moved to Calgary following  his release from prison.  In 1993, using the pseudonym "His Excellency J. J. Wills", he co-wrote a book with Robert O'Driscoll titled The New World Order in North America which Bernie Farber described as "the antisemitic ravings of a very confused mind."

He appears in the 1991 documentary film Blood in the Face, directed by Kevin Rafferty, which looks at the American neo-fascist movement. The name of the film is taken from the Biblical name Adam which in the Hebrew means to "show blood in the face." Christian Identity advocates claim this is evidence that Adam was a white man.

He died in a Calgary boarding house in 1994.

Electoral record

References

External links
Summary of the 1979 hearing before the Canadian Human Rights Tribunal. 
Canadian Human Rights Commission v. John Ross Taylor Summary of the case heard by the Supreme Court of Canada.
1965 This Hour Has Seven Days feature on hate, including an interview with Taylor

1913 births
1994 deaths
20th-century Canadian criminals
Canadian male criminals
Canadian collaborators with Nazi Germany
Canadian prisoners and detainees
Canadian fascists
Canadian social crediters
Independent candidates in the 1974 Canadian federal election
People from Toronto
Prisoners and detainees of Canada
People interned during World War II